Claudine Clark (born April 26, 1941) is an American R&B musician, best known as the singer and composer of the 1962 hit, "Party Lights", which reached No. 5 on the Billboard Hot 100.

Career
Clark was born in Macon, Georgia, United States, but grew up in Philadelphia, and she began recording in 1958 for the Herald record label, with her debut single, "Angel of Happiness".  She was backed on that recording by the Spinners. Clark then moved to New York, but she also found no commercial return from her recording on Gotham Records, before moving to Chancellor Records.  Clark then had a hit with her second single for Chancellor, with her self-penned "Party Lights". Originally the B-side of the label's preference for the A-side, "Disappointed", "Party Lights" peaked at No.5 on the Billboard Hot 100. Clark's follow-ups, "Walk Me Home from the Party" and "Walkin' Through a Cemetery", were commercial failures.

She continued to record and compose, including under the alias Joy Dawn for the Swan Records label, but saw no further tangible success.

References

External links
 VH1.com

1941 births
Living people
Musicians from Macon, Georgia
Jamie Records artists
Musicians from Philadelphia
African-American women singer-songwriters
American soul singers
Writers from Macon, Georgia
Singer-songwriters from Pennsylvania
Chancellor Records artists
21st-century African-American people
21st-century African-American women
20th-century African-American people
20th-century African-American women
Singer-songwriters from Georgia (U.S. state)